Toadstool Geologic Park is located in the Oglala National Grassland in far northwestern Nebraska. It is operated by the United States Forest Service. It contains a badlands landscape and a reconstructed sod house.  The park is named after its unusual rock formations, many of which resemble toadstools.

About
Toadstool Geologic Park is said to be the "badlands of Nebraska" or the "desert of the Pine Ridge." The park is open 24 hours a day. Toadstool Park is north of Crawford, Nebraska; to get to the park, take Nebraska Highway 2/Nebraska Highway 71 to Toadstool Road. There is a 1-mile loop trail within the park. There are many fossils along the trail; removing fossils is not allowed. Many fossils of large prehistoric animals  such as entelodonts and hyaenodons have been found here. Camping is available and there are two toilets.

The Bison Trail to Hudson-Meng Bison Kill is a 3-mile hike.

Nearby attractions
Fort Robinson
Hudson-Meng Bison Kill
Nebraska National Forest
Chadron State Park
Trailside Museum of Natural History at Fort Robinson State Park

References

External links

Toadstool Geological Park and Campground - US Forest Service
 Toadstool Geologic Park Photo & Links - Chadron State College 
Toadstool Geologic Park Hiking Trail Photos & Info

Federal lands in Nebraska
Geology of Nebraska
Protected areas of Dawes County, Nebraska
United States Forest Service protected areas
Landforms of Dawes County, Nebraska
Parks in Nebraska
Badlands of the United States